The 2020–21 Stony Brook Seawolves women's basketball team represented Stony Brook University during the 2020–21 NCAA Division I women's basketball season. The Seawolves, led by seventh-year head coach Caroline McCombs, play their home games at the Island Federal Credit Union Arena and are members in the America East Conference.

Stony Brook finished in second place in the America East after going 11–3 during the conference regular season. The Seawolves beat UMass Lowell by 20 points in the semifinals to earn a rematch with Maine in the championship game after last season's was cancelled. As the underdog, Stony Brook beat Maine 64–60 to win its first-ever NCAA Tournament berth.

As a No. 14 seed, the Seawolves lost 79–44 to No. 3 seed Arizona in the first round.

Media 
All non-televised home games and conference road games will be streamed on ESPN3 or ESPN+.

Roster

Schedule 

|-
!colspan=9 style=| Non-conference regular season

|-
!colspan=9 style=| America East Conference regular season

|-
!colspan=9 style=| America East Women's Tournament

|-
!colspan=6 style=|NCAA tournament

See also 
 2020–21 Stony Brook Seawolves men's basketball team

References 

Stony Brook Seawolves women's basketball seasons
Stony Brook Seawolves women's basketball team
Stony Brook Seawolves women's basketball team
Stony Brook Seawolves women's basketball team